The Shrine of Shah Abdul Latif Bhittai is an 18th-century Sufi shrine located in the town of Bhit Shah, in the Pakistani province of Sindh. The shrine is considered to be one of the most important in Sindh, and its annual urs festival attracts up to 500,000 visitors.

Background
The shrine was built for Shah Abdul Latif Bhittai, a noted Sindhi Sufi scholar, mystic, saint, and poet who is widely considered to be the greatest Muslim poet of the Sindhi language. His collected poems were assembled in the compilation Shah Jo Risalo. The shrine is 125 kilometres from the popular Shrine of Lal Shahbaz Qalandar in Sehwan Sharif. 

Women serve as caretakers of tombs within the shrine complex. Male singers at the shrine mimic female voices by singing in falsetto to mimic heroines in Shah Abdul Latif's poetry. The Hindu Bhil and Kolhi communities revere the shrine, as Shah Abdul Latif's poetry is considered to be tolerant of other beliefs.

Building complex

The shrine complex was built in 1772 by Mian Ghulam Shah Kalhoro to house the tomb of the Shah Abdul Latif Bhittai. The shrine complex includes a mosque and a mausoleum that open onto a large courtyard encircled by domed arcades by means of a large gateway. The complex is notable for being elaborately decorated with Sindhi tile work featuring blue and white floral themes. Shah Abdul Latif Bhittai's Surs are performed nightly at the shrine after evening prayers.

Annual festival
The shrine is site of an annual urs festival that attracts up to 500,000 visitors over the course of three days, beginning on the 13th day of the Islamic month of Safar. The festival commemorates Shah Abdul Latif's death by means of celebration, as his death is regarded to be a union with God.

See also 
Shah Jo Risalo
 Shrine of Lal Shahbaz Qalandar

 List of mausolea and shrines in Pakistan
 Sufism in Sindh
 Sufism in Pakistan

References

Matiari District
Mausoleums in Sindh
Religious buildings and structures in Sindh
Sufi shrines in Pakistan
Tourist attractions in Sindh
Shah Abdul Latif Bhittai